Carlos Alvares Ferreira (born 25 June 1966), also known as Adv. Carlos Alvares Ferreira, is an Indian politician and lawyer from Goa. He is the current member of the Goa Legislative Assembly, representing the Aldona Assembly constituency. He is also a former Assistant Solicitor General of India,  Public prosecutor and Advocate General of Goa. Ferreira contested on Indian National Congress ticket in the 2022 Goa Legislative Assembly election and emerged victorious. He defeated two term Bharatiya Janata Party MLA Glenn Ticlo by a margin of 1823 votes.

Ferreira is a senior lawyer who practices in the Bombay High Court in Goa and The Supreme Court of India. He has been one of the youngest serving Advocates General in Indian history. Ferreira has also held the positions of the State Public Prosecutor in the Bombay High Court in Goa and has also served as the Assistant Solicitor General of India under the Indian National Congress headed by the then India Prime minister Manmohan Singh from 2004–2014.

Early and personal life
Carlos Alvares Ferreira was born on 25 June 1966 in Margao to Charles Ferreira Alvares a banker who later chose to become a lawyer and a homeopathic doctor. Ferreira is married to Natasha Da Costa, a social worker by profession in January 1995. In June 1996, the couple welcomed their first child, Armando Ferreira Alvares followed by their second child, Daniel Alvares Ferreira in 1997. Ferreira and his family currently reside at Aldona, Goa, India.

Career

Lawyer (1987–present) 
Ferreira began his career as a lawyer in 1987 after graduating from Govind Ramnath Kare College of Law in Margao. He started working under his father's firm first before starting his own practice in Panjim. He was also the youngest Advocate General in Goa being appointed by Luizinho Faleiro, the then Goa Chief minister. He also served as the Legal Advisor to the then Governor of Goa and Maharastra, S.C. Jamir.

Ferreira was also the Public Prosecutor for Goa under the then Goa Chief minister, Digambar Kamat led government for the Indian National Congress. He  currently is the AICC chairperson for the Legal Cell for the State of Goa.

References

1966 births
Living people
Indian National Congress politicians from Goa
Goa MLAs 2022–2027
Indian lawyers
Senior Advocates in India
Supreme Court of India lawyers
21st-century Indian lawyers
20th-century Indian lawyers
Advocates General for Indian states